The Canadian law forbids the production, distribution, and possession of child pornography, which are punishable by up to 20 years' imprisonment or a fine of $5,000.

Visual and written representations
Prohibition covers the visual representations of child sexual abuse and other sexual activity by persons (real or imaginary) under the age of 18 years or the depiction of their sexual organ/anal region for a sexual purpose, unless an artistic, educational, scientific, or medical justification can be provided and the court accepts that. 

It also includes the written depictions of persons or characters (fictional or non-fictional) under the age of 18 engaging in sexual activity. Courts in Canada can also issue orders for the deletion of material from the internet from any computer system within the court's jurisdiction.

The current law criminalizes possession of purely fictional material and has been applied in the absence of any images of real children, including to possession of fictional stories with no pictures at all, or vice versa, cartoon pictures without any stories.

Some current law is unenforceable to the extent of exemptions carved out by the Supreme Court of Canada in R v Sharpe.

The Internet
In 2002, laws passed addressing child pornography on the Internet, regulating the nature of live-time chatting and email communications that may relate to grooming children for pornographic (e.g., web cam) or other sexual purposes. The laws also criminalize the possessing of child pornography.

Criminal Code provisions
Canadian laws addressing child pornography are set out in Part V of Criminal Code dealing with Sexual Offences, Public Morals and Disorderly Conduct: Offences Tending to Corrupt Morals. Section 163.1 of the Code defines child pornography to include "a visual representation, whether or not it was made by electronic or mechanical means", that "shows a person who is or is depicted as being under the age of eighteen years and is engaged in or is depicted as engaged in explicit sexual activity", or "the dominant characteristic of which is the depiction, for a sexual purpose, of a sexual organ or the anal region of a person under the age of eighteen years."

The current minimum penalty for possession of child pornography is six months of imprisonment.

Cases

Eli Langer art show trial

One early application of this law was the Eli Langer case. In 1993, this Toronto artist had an exhibition at the Mercer Gallery. His drawings included images of children in sexual positions. Police raided the gallery and confiscated the works. Langer was eventually acquitted after a trial because his work was considered artistic enough to be justified as protected speech.

R v Sharpe

The whole law against simple possession of child pornography was declared void for two years in British Columbia following a 1998 ruling (R v Sharpe) by the Supreme Court of British Columbia, but this decision was subsequently overturned by the Canadian Supreme Court. Moreover, the definitive 2001 Supreme Court ruling on the case interprets the child pornography statute to include purely fictional material even when no real children were involved in its production. Chief Justice Beverley McLachlin wrote,
The court also carved out some exemptions to the law.

Gordon Chin trial
In October 2005, Canadian police arrested a 26-year-old Edmonton, Alberta man named Gordon Chin for importing Japanese manga depicting explicit hentai of child pornography. Chin's attorney claimed Chin did not know it was illegal, and that he was naive. Chin was sentenced by the judge to an eighteen-month conditional sentence, during which he was barred from using the Internet. This is the first-known manga-related child pornography case in Canada. It is also the first-known case that exclusively prosecutes this offense, not used in conjunction with other laws to increase sentencing.

See also
 Legality of child pornography
 Child pornography laws in the United States
 Child pornography laws in Australia
 Child pornography laws in the United Kingdom
 Child pornography laws in Portugal
 Child pornography laws in the Netherlands
 Child pornography laws in Japan

References

Law of Canada
Canadian pornography
Child pornography law
Childhood in Canada